The Union of the Baptist Christians in North Macedonia is a small fellowship of Baptist churches in North Macedonia.

Baptist work existed in Macedonia as early as 1928. The Union of Baptist Christians was organized in 1991. It is a member of the European Baptist Federation and the Baptist World Alliance.

Baptists
Christian organizations established in 1991
Baptist denominations in Europe
Baptist denominations established in the 20th century
Protestantism in North Macedonia
1991 establishments in the Republic of Macedonia